Hartford Athletic is an American professional soccer team based in Hartford, Connecticut. The club was founded in 2018 and started play in the USL Championship in 2019.  It is the only pro soccer team in Connecticut.

History
On June 8, 2021, Hartford Athletic announced they will be fielding a women's side to compete in the new USL W League beginning in 2022.

Stadium
The club plays on the grounds of Trinity Health Stadium, with a capacity of 5,500. The 1935 stadium was renovated and reopened on July 13, 2019, despite the fact the stadium was not completely finished.  Lights were completed and first used for the stadium's first night game on September 14, 2019 (Hartford Athletic vs. Louisville City FC).

During the construction of Trinity Health Stadium, Athletic played home games at Pratt & Whitney Stadium at Rentschler Field. They played their first home game in front of more than 11,000 supporters.

Hartford's first U.S. Open Cup match in 2019, which was also the first win in club history, was played at Al-Marzook Field in West Hartford.

Sponsorship

Players and staff

Roster

Players with multiple nationalities

   Ashkanov Apollon
   Danny Barrera
   Jeciel Cedeño
   Dren Dobruna
   Antoine Hoppenot
   Niall Logue
   Conor McGlynn
   Kaveh Rad
   Richard Sánchez
   Ali Taleb

Team management
{|class="wikitable"
|-
!style="background:#002974; color:white; border:2px solid #009943;" scope="col" colspan=2|Front office
|-

|-
!style="background:#002974; color:white; border:2px solid #002974;" scope="col" colspan=2|Coaching staff
|-

Club captains

Club culture

The supporters for Hartford Athletic are split between five groups based on their geographical location within the state of Connecticut:
 The 19th Regiment – The first supporters group founded in early 2019 shortly after the announcement of the club. Today, it represents supporters based out of the Greater Hartford area and Northern Connecticut.
 Mad Hat Massive – Independent supporters group representing members from Fairfield and Litchfield counties, with their home pub hosting the official supporters away days watch parties at TK's American Cafe in Danbury where the Jell-O Shot tradition began. Members of the Independent Supporters’ Council.
 The Boonies – Members of the Mad Hat Massive in the greater Torrington area.
 Elm City Casuals – Independent supporters based out of the Greater New Haven area.  They’re independent.  They like pizza and riding trains.  Members of the Independent Supporters’ Council.
 East Side Rising – Supporters group founded in 2020 to represent Eastern Connecticut, nicknamed "A Family of Fans."
 Raza Brava – Latino-centric supporters group representing the greater Hartford area.

Each group is separately managed but they stand and chant together on the east end of Trinity Health Stadium for home matches.

Starting in the 2022 season, the 19th Regiment, Mad Hat Massive and the Elm City Casuals will unite as one group, called The Bonanza

Among the notable chants used is the "Brass Bonanza," a melody sung by the supporters groups after scoring a goal, which was also used for the former NHL team in the city, the Hartford Whalers, for the same circumstances. The groups also use Bob Marley's classic "Three Little Birds" for the beginning of matches and when the opposing team scores.

Team records

Year-by-year

Head coaches
 Includes USL regular season, USL playoffs, U.S. Open Cup. Excludes friendlies.

Average attendance

See also
 Hartford City FC
 AC Connecticut

References

External links
 

 
Association football clubs established in 2018
USL Championship teams
2018 establishments in Connecticut
Sports teams in Hartford, Connecticut
Soccer clubs in Connecticut